Raymond Allen Carlson  (born 2 October 1948) is a former South African rugby union player.

Playing career
Carlson grew up in East London, the son of Ken Carlson, who refereed the Durban test between the Springboks and Lions in 1962. In 1972 Carlson toured with the Gazelles, a South African under-24 team, to Argentina.

Carlson played only one test for the Springboks, the first test against the 1972 touring England team at Ellis Park in Johannesburg.

Test history

See also
List of South Africa national rugby union players – Springbok no. 456

References

1948 births
Living people
Alumni of Selborne College
Eastern Province Elephants players
Rugby union players from East London, Eastern Cape
Sharks (Currie Cup) players
South Africa international rugby union players
South African rugby union players
Western Province (rugby union) players
Rugby union fullbacks